Lukas Rindos (born August 23, 1987) is a Czech professional ice hockey player. 

He played six seasons in the Czech Extraliga with HC Litvínov, playing 142 games in total.

References

External links

1987 births
Living people
Czech ice hockey forwards
HC Litvínov players
HC Most players
Piráti Chomutov players
Sportspeople from Chomutov
HC Stadion Litoměřice players
HC Tábor players
Czech expatriate ice hockey players in Germany